The  (German plural ) is the federal controlled-access highway system in Germany. The literal meaning of the word  is 'Federal Auto(mobile) Track'.

German  have no federally mandated general speed limit for some classes of vehicles. However, limits are posted and enforced in areas that are urbanised, substandard, accident-prone, or under construction. On speed-unrestricted stretches, an advisory speed limit of  applies. While driving faster is not illegal in the absence of a speed limit, it can cause an increased liability in the case of a collision (which mandatory auto insurance has to cover); courts have ruled that an "ideal driver" who is exempt from absolute liability for "inevitable" tort under the law would not exceed .

A 2017 report by the Federal Road Research Institute reported that in 2015, 70.4% of the Autobahn network had only the advisory speed limit, 6.2% had temporary speed limits due to weather or traffic conditions, and 23.4% had permanent speed limits.

Network map

Names
Only federally built controlled-access highways with certain construction standards including at least two lanes per direction are called Bundesautobahn. They have their own white-on-blue signs and numbering system. In the 1930s, when construction began on the system, the official name was Reichsautobahn. Various other controlled-access highways exist on the federal (Bundesstraße), state (Landesstraße), district, and municipal level but are not part of the Autobahn network and are officially referred to as Kraftfahrstraße (with rare exceptions, like A 995 Munich-Giesing–Brunntal until 2018). These highways are considered autobahnähnlich (autobahn-like) and are sometimes colloquially called Gelbe Autobahn (yellow autobahn) because most of them are Bundesstraßen (federal highways) with yellow signs. Some controlled-access highways are classified as "Bundesautobahn" in spite of not meeting the autobahn construction standard (for example, the A 62 near Pirmasens).

Similar to some other German words, the term autobahn when used in English is usually understood to refer specifically to the national highway system of Germany, whereas in German the word autobahn is applied to any controlled highway in any country. For this reason in German, the more specific term Bundesautobahn is strongly preferred when the intent is to make specific reference to Germany's Autobahn network.

Construction

Nearly all exits are to the right; rare left-hand exits result from incomplete interchanges where the "straight-on" leads into the exit. In the postwar years, a thicker asphaltic concrete cross-section with full paved hard shoulders came into general use.

Numbering system

The current autobahn numbering system in use in Germany was introduced in 1974. All autobahns are named by using the capital letter A, which simply stands for "Autobahn" followed by a blank and a number (for example A 8). The main autobahns going all across Germany have a single digit number. Shorter autobahns that are of regional importance (e.g. connecting two major cities or regions within Germany) have a double digit number (e.g. A 24, connecting Berlin and Hamburg). The system is as follows:

 A 10 to A 19 are in eastern Germany (Berlin, Saxony-Anhalt, parts of Saxony and Brandenburg)
 A 20 to A 29 are in northern and northeastern Germany
 A 30 to A 39 are in Lower Saxony (northwestern Germany) and Thuringia
 A 40 to A 49 are in the Rhine-Ruhr to Frankfurt Rhine-Main
 A 52 to A 59 are in the Lower Rhine region to Cologne
 A 60 to A 67 are in Rhineland-Palatinate, Saarland, Hesse and northern Baden-Württemberg
 A 70 to A 73 are in Thuringia, northern Bavaria and parts of Saxony
 A 81 is in Baden-Württemberg
 A 90 to A 99 are in (southern) Bavaria
 A 98 is in Baden-Württemberg

There are also some very short autobahns built just for local traffic (e.g. ring roads or the A 555 from Cologne to Bonn) that usually have three digits for numbering. The first digit used is similar to the system above, depending on the region.

East–west routes are even-numbered, north–south routes are odd-numbered. The north–south autobahns are generally numbered from west to east; that is to say, the more easterly roads are given higher numbers. Similarly, the east–west routes are numbered from north (lower numbers) to south (higher numbers).

History

Early years
The idea for the construction of the autobahn was first conceived in the mid-1920s during the days of the Weimar Republic, but the construction was slow, and most projected sections did not progress much beyond the planning stage due to economic problems and a lack of political support. One project was the private initiative HaFraBa which planned a "car-only road" crossing Germany from Hamburg in the north via central Frankfurt am Main to Basel in Switzerland. Parts of the HaFraBa were completed in the late 1930s and early 1940s, but construction eventually was halted by World War II. The first public road of this kind was completed in 1932 between Cologne and Bonn and opened by Konrad Adenauer (Lord Mayor of Cologne and future Chancellor of West Germany) on 6 August 1932. Today, that road is the Bundesautobahn 555. This road was not yet called Autobahn and lacked a centre median like modern motorways, but instead was termed a Kraftfahrstraße ("motor vehicle road") with two lanes each direction without intersections, pedestrians, bicycles, or animal-powered transportation.

1930s

Just days after the 1933 Nazi takeover, Adolf Hitler enthusiastically embraced an ambitious autobahn construction project, appointing Fritz Todt, the Inspector General of German Road Construction, to lead it. By 1936, 130,000 workers were directly employed in construction, as well as an additional 270,000 in the supply chain for construction equipment, steel, concrete, signage, maintenance equipment, etc. In rural areas, new camps to house the workers were built near construction sites. The job creation program aspect was not especially important because full employment was almost reached by 1936. However, according to one source autobahn workers were often conscripted through the compulsory Reich Labor Service (and thereby removed from the unemployment registry).

The autobahns were not primarily intended as major infrastructure improvement of special value to the military as sometimes stated. Their military value was limited as all large-scale military transportation in Germany was done by train to save fuel. The propaganda ministry turned the construction of the autobahns into a major media event that attracted international attention.

The autobahns formed the first limited-access, high-speed road network in the world, with the first section from Frankfurt am Main to Darmstadt opening in 1935. This straight section was used for high-speed record attempts by the Grand Prix racing teams of Mercedes-Benz and Auto Union until a fatal accident involving popular German race driver Bernd Rosemeyer in early 1938. The world record of  set by Rudolf Caracciola on this stretch just prior to the accident remains one of the highest speeds ever achieved on a public motorway. In the 1930s, a ten-kilometre stretch of what is today Bundesautobahn 9 just south of Dessau—called the Dessauer Rennstrecke—had bridges with no piers and was designed for cars like the Mercedes-Benz T80 to attempt to make land speed records. The T80 was to make a record attempt in January 1940, but plans were abandoned after the outbreak of World War II in Europe in September 1939.

World War II
During World War II, many of Germany's workers were required for various war production tasks. Construction work on the autobahn system therefore increasingly relied on forced workers and concentration camp inmates, and working conditions were very poor. As of 1942, when the war turned against the Third Reich, only  out of a planned  of autobahn had been completed.

Meanwhile, the median strips of some autobahns were paved over to allow their conversion into auxiliary airstrips. Aircraft were either stashed in numerous tunnels or camouflaged in nearby woods. However, for the most part during the war, the autobahns were not militarily significant. Motor vehicles, such as trucks, could not carry goods or troops as quickly or in as much bulk and in the same numbers as trains could, and the autobahns could not be used by tanks as their weight and caterpillar tracks damaged the road surface. The general shortage of petrol in Germany during much of the war, as well as the low number of trucks and motor vehicles needed for direct support of military operations, further decreased the autobahn's significance. As a result, most military and economic freight was carried by rail. After the war, numerous sections of the autobahns were in bad shape, severely damaged by heavy Allied bombing and military demolition. Furthermore, thousands of kilometres of autobahns remained unfinished, their construction brought to a halt by 1943 due to the increasing demands of the war effort.

West Germany: 1949–1990
In West Germany (FRG), most existing autobahns were repaired soon after the war. During the 1950s, the West German government restarted the construction program. It invested in new sections and in improvements to older ones. Finishing the incomplete sections took longer, with some stretches opened to traffic by the 1980s. Some sections cut by the Iron Curtain in 1945 were only completed after German reunification in 1990. Others were never completed, as more advantageous routes were found.

East Germany: 1949–1990

The autobahns of East Germany (GDR) were neglected in comparison to those in West Germany after 1945. East German autobahns were used primarily for GDR military traffic and for state-owned farming or manufacturing vehicles. The speed limits on the GDR autobahns were rigorously enforced by the Volkspolizei, whose patrol cars were frequently found hiding under camouflage tarpaulins waiting for speeders.

Reunification: 1990–present day
The last  of the remaining original Reichsautobahn, a section of A 11 northeast of Berlin near Gartz built in 1936—the westernmost remainder of the never-finished Berlinka—are scheduled for replacement around 2015. Roadway condition is described as "deplorable"; the -long concrete slabs, too long for proper expansion, are cracking under the weight of the traffic as well as the weather.

Length
Longer similar systems can be found in the United States and in China. However both the U.S. and China have an area nearly 30 times bigger than Germany, which demonstrates the high density of Germany's highway system.

German-built Reichsautobahnen in other countries

The first autobahn in Austria was the West Autobahn from Wals near Salzburg to Vienna. Building started by command of Adolf Hitler shortly after the Anschluss in 1938. It extended the Reichsautobahn 26 from Munich (the present-day A 8), however only  including the branch-off of the planned Tauern Autobahn was opened to the public on 13 September 1941. Construction works discontinued the next year and were not resumed until 1955.

There are sections of the former German Reichsautobahn system in the former eastern territories of Germany, i.e. East Prussia, Farther Pomerania, and Silesia; these territories became parts of Poland and the Soviet Union with the implementation of the Oder–Neisse line after World War II. Parts of the planned autobahn from Berlin to Königsberg (the Berlinka) were completed as far as Stettin (Szczecin) on 27 September 1936. After the war, they were incorporated as the A6 autostrada of the Polish motorway network. A single-carriageway section of the Berlinka east of the former "Polish Corridor" and the Free City of Danzig opened in 1938; today it forms the Polish S22 expressway from Elbląg (Elbing) to the border with the Russian Kaliningrad Oblast, where it is continued by the R516 regional road. Also on 27 September 1936, a section from Breslau (Wrocław) to Liegnitz (Legnica) in Silesia was inaugurated, which today is part of the Polish A4 autostrada, followed by the (single vehicle) Reichsautobahn 9 from Bunzlau (Bolesławiec) to Sagan (Żagań) the next year, today part of the Polish A18 autostrada.

After the German occupation of Czechoslovakia, plans for a motorway connecting Breslau with Vienna via Brno (Brünn) in the "Protectorate of Bohemia and Moravia" were carried out from 1939 until construction works discontinued in 1942. A section of the former Strecke 88 near Brno is today part of the D52 motorway of the Czech Republic. Also, there is the isolated and abandoned twin-carriageway Borovsko Bridge southeast of Prague, on which construction started in July 1939 and halted after the assassination of Reinhard Heydrich by former Czechoslovak army soldiers at the end of May 1942.

Current density

From 2009 Germany has embarked on a massive widening and rehabilitation project, expanding the lane count of many of its major arterial routes, such as the A 5 in the southwest and A 8 going east–west.

Most sections of Germany's autobahns have two or three, sometimes four lanes in each direction in addition to an emergency lane (hard shoulder). A few sections have only two lanes in each direction without emergency lanes, and short slip-roads and ramps.

The motorway density in Germany is 36 kilometers per thousand square kilometer in 2016, close to that of the smaller countries nearby (Netherlands, Belgium, Luxembourg, Switzerland, Slovenia).

Facilities

Emergency telephones

About 17,000 emergency telephones are distributed at regular intervals all along the autobahn network, with triangular stickers on the armco barriers pointing the way to the nearest one. Despite the increasing use of mobile phones, there are still about 150 calls made each day on average (after some 700 in 2013). This still equals four calls per kilometre each year. The location of the caller is automatically sent to the operator.

Parking, rest areas, and truck stops

For breaks during longer journeys, parking sites, rest areas, and truck stops are distributed over the complete Autobahn network. Parking on the autobahn is prohibited in the strictest terms outside these designated areas. There is a distinction between "managed" and "unmanaged" rest areas. (German: bewirtschaftet / unbewirtschaftet).

 Unmanaged rest areas are basically only parking spaces, sometimes with toilets. They form a part of the German highway system; the plots of land are federal property. Autobahn exits leading to such parking areas are marked at least  (mostly ) in advance with a blue sign with the white letter "P". They are usually found every few kilometres. Some of them bear local or historic names.

A managed rest area (German: Autobahnraststätte or Raststätte for short) usually also includes a filling station, charging station, lavatories, toilets, and baby changes. Most rest areas also have restaurants, shops, public telephones, Internet access, and a playground. Some have hotels. Mandated every  or so, rest areas are usually open all night.

Both kinds of rest areas are directly on the autobahn, with their own exits, and any service roads connecting them to the rest of the road network are usually closed to general traffic. Apart from rare exceptions, the autobahn must not be left nor entered at rest areas.

 Truck stops (German Autohof, plural Autohöfe) are large filling stations located at general exits, usually at a small distance from the autobahn, combined with fast food facilities and/or restaurants, but have no ramps of their own. They mostly sell fuel at normal price level while the Raststätten fuel prices are significantly higher.

Rest areas and truck stops are marked several times as motorists approach, starting several kilometres in advance, and include large signs that often include icons announcing what kinds of facilities travellers can expect, such as hotels, filling stations, rest areas, etc.

Speed limits

Germany's autobahns are famous for being among the few public roads in the world without blanket speed limits for cars and motorcycles. As such, they are important German cultural identifiers, "often mentioned in hushed, reverential tones by motoring enthusiasts and looked at with a mix of awe and terror by outsiders." Some speed limits are implemented on different autobahns.

Certain limits are imposed on some classes of vehicles:

Additionally, speed limits are posted at most on- and off-ramps and interchanges and other danger points like sections under construction or in need of repair.

The advisory speed is not enforceable; however, being involved in an accident driving at higher speeds can lead to the driver being deemed at least partially responsible due to "increased operating danger" (Erhöhte Betriebsgefahr).

The Federal Road Research Institute (Bundesanstalt für Straßenwesen) solicited information about speed regulations on autobahns from the sixteen States and reported the following, comparing the years 2006 and 2008:

Certain stretches have lower speed limits during wet weather.

Some limits were imposed to reduce pollution and noise. Limits can also be temporarily put into place through dynamic traffic guidance systems that display the corresponding message. More than half of the total length of the German autobahn network has no speed limit, about one third has a permanent limit, and the remaining parts have a temporary or conditional limit.

These limiters can be deactivated, so speeds up to  might arise on the German autobahn, but due to other traffic, such speeds are generally not attainable except during certain times like between 10 p.m. and 6 a.m. or on Sundays (when truck drivers have to rest by law). Furthermore, there are certain autobahn sections which are known for having light traffic, making such speeds attainable during most days (especially some of those located in Eastern Germany). Most unlimited sections of the autobahn are located outside densely populated areas.

There is no general minimum speed but drivers are not allowed to drive at an unnecessarily low speed as this would lead to significant traffic disturbance and an increased collision risk.

Public debate
German national speed limits have a historical association with war-time restrictions and deprivations, the Nazi era, and the Soviet era in East Germany. After the Nazi dictatorship, German society was happy to overcome the traumas of war by freeing itself from most government restrictions, prohibitions and regulations. "Free driving for free citizens" ("freie Fahrt für freie Bürger"), a slogan promoted by the German Auto Club since the 1970s, is a popular slogan among those opposing autobahn speed restrictions. Tarek Al-Wazir, head of the Green Party in Hesse, and currently the Hessian Transport Minister has stated that "the speed limit in Germany has a similar status as the right to bear arms in the American debate. At some point, a speed limit will become reality here, and soon we will not be able to remember the time before. It's like the smoking ban in restaurants."

Early history
The Weimar Republic had no federally required speed limits. The first crossroads-free road for motorized vehicles only, now A 555 between Bonn and Cologne, had a  limit when it opened in 1932. After the war, the four Allied occupation zones established their own speed limits until the divided East German and West German republics were constituted in 1949; initially, the Nazi speed limits were restored in both East and West Germany.

After the World Wars
In December 1952 the West German legislature voted to abolish all national speed limits, seeing them as Nazi relics, reverting to State-level decisions. National limits were reestablished incrementally. The  urban limit was enacted in 1956, effective in 1957. The  limit on rural roads—except autobahns—became effective in 1972.

Oil crisis of the 1970s
Just prior to the 1973 oil crisis, Germany, Switzerland, and Austria all had no general speed restriction on autobahns. During the crisis, like other nations, Germany imposed temporary speed restrictions; for example,  on autobahns effective 13 November 1973. Automakers projected a 20% plunge in sales, which they attributed in part to the lowered speed limits. The 100 km/h limit championed by Transportation Minister Lauritz Lauritzen lasted 111 days. Adjacent nations with unlimited speed autobahns, Austria and Switzerland, imposed permanent  limits after the crisis.

However, after the crisis eased in 1974, the upper house of the German parliament, which was controlled by conservative parties, successfully resisted the imposition of a permanent mandatory limit supported by Chancellor Brandt. The upper house insisted on a  recommended limit until a thorough study of the effects of a mandatory limit could be conducted. Accordingly, the Federal Highway Research Institute conducted a multiple-year experiment, switching between mandatory and recommended limits on two test stretches of autobahn. In the final report issued in 1977, the Institute stated the mandatory speed limit could reduce the autobahn death toll but there would be economic impacts, so a political decision had to be made due to the trade-offs involved. At that time, the federal government declined to impose a mandatory limit. The fatality rate trend on the German autobahn mirrored those of other nations' motorways that imposed a general speed limit.

Environmental concerns of the 1980s
In the mid-1980s, acid rain and sudden forest destruction renewed debate on whether or not a general speed limit should be imposed on autobahns. A car's fuel consumption increases with high speed, and fuel conservation is a key factor in reducing air pollution. The federal government sponsored a large-scale experiment with a  speed limit in order to measure the impact of reduced speeds on emissions and compliance. Afterward, again, the federal government declined to impose a mandatory limit, deciding the modest measured emission reduction would have no meaningful effect on forest loss. By 1987, all restrictions on test sections had been removed, even in Hesse where the state government was controlled by a "red-green" coalition.

German reunification
An extensive program of the four Es (enforcement, education, engineering, and emergency response) brought the number of traffic deaths back to pre-unification levels after a decade of effort while traffic regulations were conformed to western standards (e.g.,  freeway advisory limit,  on other rural roads, and 0.05 percent BAC).

Since reunification
These limits were attempts to reduce ozone pollution.

During his term of office (1998 to 2005) as Chancellor of Germany, Gerhard Schröder opposed an autobahn speed limit, famously referring to Germany as an Autofahrernation (a "nation of drivers").

While this initiative is primarily a part of the SPD's general strategic outline for the future and, according to practices, not necessarily meant to affect immediate government policy, the proposal had stirred up a debate once again; Germany's chancellor since 2005, Angela Merkel, and leading cabinet members expressed outspoken disapproval of such a measure.

In 2008, the Social Democratic-Green Party coalition controlling Germany's smallest state, the paired City-State of Bremen and Bremerhaven, imposed a 120-kilometre-per-hour (75 mph) limit on its last  of speed-unlimited autobahn in hopes of leading other States to do likewise.

In 2011, the first-ever Green minister-president of any German state, Winfried Kretschmann of Baden-Württemberg initially argued for a similar, state-level  limit. However, Baden-Württemberg is an important location for the German motor industry, including the headquarters of Daimler AG and Porsche; the ruling coalition ultimately decided  a state-level limit on its  of speed-unlimited roads—arguing for nationwide speed limit instead.

In 2014, the conservative-liberal ruling coalition of Saxony confirmed its rejection of a general speed limit on autobahns, instead advocating dynamic traffic controls where appropriate. Between 2010 and 2014 in the State of Hesse, transportation ministers Dieter Posch and his successor Florian Rentsch, both members of the Free Democratic Party, removed or raised speed limits on several sections of autobahn following regular 5-year reviews of speed limit effectiveness; some sections just prior to the installation of Tarek Al-Wazir (Green Party) as Transportation Minister in January 2014 as part of an uneasy CDU-green coalition government. In 2015, the left-green coalition government of Thuringia declared that a general autobahn limit was a federal matter; Thuringia would not unilaterally impose a general statewide limit, although the Thuringian environmental minister had recommended a  limit.

However, the ruling Green-Social Democratic coalition lost its majority in the March 2016 elections; while Mr Hermann retained his post in the new Green-Christian Democratic government, he put aside preparations for a speed limit due to opposition from his new coalition partners.

In 2019, the Green Party introduced a motion to introduce a hard 130 km/h speed limit on the autobahn, but it was defeated in the Bundestag. A second attempt to reopen debate on the issue was made by the Left Party in 2022, rejected by the majority of the opposition CDU/CSU and Alternative for Germany (AfD) and the governing Free Democratic Party (FDP). However, Alliance 90/The Greens and the SPD were obliged by their traffic light coalition with the FDP to reject the proposal.

Safety
In 2014, autobahns carried 31% of motorized road traffic while accounting for 11% of Germany's traffic deaths. The autobahn fatality rate of 1.6 deaths per billion travel-kilometres compared favorably with the 4.6 rate on urban streets and 6.5 rate on rural roads. However, these types of roads are not comparable according to German traffic researcher Bernhard Schlag: "You don't have some of the problems that are accident-prone there at all. No cyclists, no pedestrians, no crossing traffic, hardly any direct oncoming traffic. In that sense, it's not surprising that autobahns are relatively safe roads [compared to other road types]."

According to official statistics from 2018, unlimited highways in Germany claimed about 71% of fatalities on highways. However, autobahns without speed limits also account for 70% of the entire autobahn network, which puts the high proportion of collision fatalities on stretches without speed limits into perspective. The often resulting thinking that speed limits would not make roads significantly safer, however, is a fallacy, since it is precisely those roads that have a high volume of traffic and thus a high risk of collisions that are given speed limits.

According to Schlag, unsafe and older drivers, in particular, would avoid the autobahn because they perceive the high-speed differentials and very fast drivers as scary, and instead congregate on rural roads where the risk of collisions is higher anyway.

In contrast to other road types, where the number of collisions has continuously decreased, the number of collisions on autobahns has remained relatively stable or even increased for several years since 2009.

According to a report by the Federal Statistical Office, fast driving is the main cause of collisions on autobahns.

According to the 2018 edition of the European Road Safety Observatory's Traffic Safety Basic Facts report, an above-average number of accidents end in fatalities on a 1000-kilometer stretch of highway in Germany compared to other EU countries.

Although Germany has a very low total traffic-related death rate, if only the mortality rate on highways is considered, Germany is in the rear midfield in a Europe-wide comparison of the number of traffic fatalities per thousand kilometers driven on highways in 2016.

An evaluation by the  shows that in 2016 statistically 26% fewer people died on autobahns with a speed limit per kilometer than on autobahns without. A similar trend could be observed in the number of serious injuries.

Between 1970 and 2010, overall German road fatalities decreased by almost 80% from 19,193 to 3,648; over the same time period, autobahn deaths halved from 945 to 430 deaths. Statistics for 2013 show total German traffic deaths had declined to the lowest count ever recorded: 3,340 (428 on autobahns); a representative of the Federal Statistical Office attributed the general decline to harsh winter weather that delayed the start of the motorcycle-riding season. In 2014, there was a total of 3,377 road fatalities, while autobahn deaths dropped to 375.

* per 1,000,000,000 travel-kilometres

In 2012, the leading cause of autobahn accidents was "excessive speed (for conditions)": 6,587 so-called "speed related" crashes claimed the lives of 179 people, which represents almost half (46.3%) of 387 autobahn fatalities that year. However, "excessive speed" does not mean that a speed limit has been exceeded, but that police determined at least one party travelled too fast for existing road or weather conditions. On autobahns 22 people died per 1,000 injury crashes, a lower rate than the 29 deaths per 1,000 injury accidents on conventional rural roads, which in turn is five times higher than the risk on urban roads—speeds are higher on rural roads and autobahns than urban roads, increasing the severity potential of a crash.

Safety: international comparison
A few countries publish the safety record of their motorways; the Federal Highway Research Institute provided IRTAD statistics for the year 2012:

However, there are many differences between countries in their geography, economy, traffic growth, highway system size, degree of urbanization and motorization, and so on.

The European Union publishes statistics reported by its members.

Travel speeds
The federal government does not regularly measure or estimate travel speeds. One study reported in a transportation engineering journal offered historical perspective on the increase in travel speeds over a decade:

Source: Kellermann, G: Geschwindigkeitsverhalten im Autobahnnetz 1992. Straße+Autobahn, Issue 5/1995.

In 2006, speeds were recorded using automated detection loops in the State of Brandenburg at two points: on a six-lane section of A 9 near Niemegk with a  advisory speed limit; and on a four-lane section of A 10 bypassing Berlin near Groß Kreutz with a  mandatory limit. The results were:

At peak times on the "free-flowing" section of A 9, over 60% of road users exceeded the recommended  maximum speed, more than 30% of motorists exceeded , and more than 15% exceeded —in other words the so-called "85th-percentile speed" was in excess of 170 km/h.

Toll roads
On 1 January 2005, a new system came into effect for mandatory tolls (Mautpflicht) on heavy trucks (those weighing more than 12 t) while using the German autobahn system (LKW-Maut). The German government contracted with a private company, Toll Collect GmbH, to operate the toll collection system, which has involved the use of vehicle-mounted transponders and roadway-mounted sensors installed throughout Germany. The toll is calculated depending on the toll route, as well as based on the pollution class of the vehicle, its weight and the number of axles on the vehicles. Certain vehicles, such as emergency vehicles and buses, are exempt from the toll. An average user is charged €0.15 per kilometre, or about $0.31 per mile (Toll Collect, 2007).

Traffic laws and enforcement

Driving in Germany is regulated by the Straßenverkehrs-Ordnung (road traffic regulations, abbreviated StVO). Enforcement on the federal Autobahnen is handled by each state's highway patrol (Autobahnpolizei), often using unmarked police cars and motorcycles and usually equipped with video cameras, thus allowing easier enforcement of laws such as tailgating. Notable laws include the following.
 The right lane should be used when it is free (Rechtsfahrgebot) and the left lane is generally intended only for overtaking unless traffic is too dense to justify driving only on the right lane. It is legal to give a short horn or light signal (flashing headlights or Lichthupe) in order to indicate the intention of overtaking, but a safe distance to the vehicle in front must be maintained, otherwise this might be regarded as an act of coercion.
 Penalties for tailgating were increased in May 2006 to a maximum of €375 (now €400) and three months' license suspension: "drivers must keep a distance in metres that is equal to half their speed. For example, a driver going 100 km/h on the autobahn must keep a distance of at least 50 metres (165 feet)". The penalty increase followed uproar after an infamous fatal crash on Autobahn 5 in 2003.
 In a traffic jam, drivers must form a rescue lane (Rettungsgasse) to allow emergency services to reach the scene of an accident. This emergency corridor is to be created on the dividing line between the two leftmost lanes; following the guiding principle of if on the left, drive left, else drive right, vehicles may cross into another lane if need be. 
 It is unlawful to stop for any reason on the autobahn, except for emergencies and when unavoidable, like traffic jams or being involved in an accident. This includes stopping on emergency lanes. Running out of fuel is considered an avoidable occurrence, as by law there are petrol stations directly on the autobahn approximately every . Drivers may face fines and up to six months' suspension, should it come to a stop that was deemed unnecessary by the police. In some cases (if there is a direct danger to life and limb or property e.g. cars and highway infrastructure) it may also be considered a crime and the driver could receive a prison sentence (up to 5 years). 
 Overtaking on the right (undertaking) is strictly forbidden, except when stuck in traffic jams. This is not referred to as overtaking, but driving past. Even if the car overtaken is illegally occupying the left-hand lane, it is not an acceptable excuse; in such cases, the police will routinely stop and fine both drivers. However, exceptions can and have sometimes been made.

In popular culture

Film and television
 Alarm für Cobra 11 – Die Autobahnpolizei (Alarm for Cobra 11 – The Autobahn Police, 1996–), a famous German TV series focusing on the work of a team of motorway police officers and their investigations, set in the autobahn-intertwined Rhine-Ruhr metropolitan area.

Music
 "Autobahn", a song and album by German electronic band Kraftwerk (1974)
 "Autobahn", a song by South Korean Boyband Monsta X Under their tenth extended play "No Limit" (2021)

Video games
Need for Speed: ProStreet, Burnout 3: Takedown, and Burnout Dominator use autobahn as one of their tracks. Euro Truck Simulator, German Truck Simulator, and Euro Truck Simulator 2 feature the Autobahn in their open world maps. Burnout 3: Takedown named them as Alpine while Burnout Dominator divided them into two (Autobahn and Autobahn Loop).
Need for Speed: Porsche Unleashed also had a track that had the player drive across different sections of the autobahn. The entire game world of Crash Time: Autobahn Pursuit is set on the autobahn.
In Gran Turismo 5, Gran Turismo 6 and Gran Turismo 7, a trophy is awarded to those who have driven the same distance as the autobahn total length. In December 2010 video game developer Synetic GmbH and Conspiracy Entertainment released the title Alarm für Cobra 11 – Die Autobahnpolizei featuring real world racing and mission-based gameplay. It is taken from the popular German television series about a two-man team of Autobahnpolizei first set in Berlin then later in North Rhine-Westphalia.

See also
Reichsautobahn
Transport in Germany
List of autobahns in Germany
List of controlled-access highway systems
Evolution of motorway construction in European nations

References

Further reading

External links

 Official website (English)

German website with descriptions of all autobahn routes and exits 
English-language website that discusses all aspects of the autobahn

 
Transport systems
Roads in Germany